The Church, an Australian psychedelic rock band, formed in Sydney in 1980. They have released 25 studio albums, numerous singles and other releases and an additional studio album under the name "The Refo:mation". This discography lists their original Australian releases, along with significant overseas compilations and singles.

Four of the albums listed under the "Studio albums" section are outtake collections:

 A Quick Smoke at Spot's: Archives 1986-1990, a collection of otherwise unavailable songs from that period
 Parallel Universe, a 2-CD set with one CD (remixture) consisting of radically remixed versions of tracks from After Everything Now This, while the other (mixture) consists of outtakes from that album
 Beside Yourself consists of outtakes from the sessions for the studio album Forget Yourself.
 Back with Two Beasts consists of outtakes from the Uninvited, Like the Clouds album sessions.

Note in the "Compilations" section: Temperature Drop in Downtown Winterland, a UK-only tour tie-in EP, collects previously released A & B sides; Hindsight features tracks from the band's albums up to 1987, plus hitherto-uncollected B-sides of singles to that date; Tin Mine features one otherwise unavailable studio track, "Leverage".

Studio albums

Live albums

Compilations

Extended plays

Singles

Video albums

Studio album as The Refo:mation

References

General
 Note: Archived [on-line] copy has limited functionality.

Specific

External links

The Church Discography
The Church, archived from the original at Australian Rock Database on 6 October 2012. Retrieved on 2 March 2014

Albums by The Church at Rate Your Music

Discography
Rock music discographies
Discographies of Australian artists